Muddy Run is a  stream in northern New Castle County, Delaware in the United States.

Course

Muddy Run rises on the Persimmon Run divide in New Castle County, Delaware and flows south then northeast to meet the Christina River at Heather Woods.

Watershed
Muddy Run drains  of area, receives about 45.6 in/year of precipitation, has a topographic wetness index of 581.51 and is about 23.1% forested.

See also
List of Delaware rivers

Maps

References

Rivers of Delaware
Rivers of New Castle County, Delaware
Tributaries of the Christina River